The Van Diemen's Land Ensign is an unofficial merchant flag, which was used in the colony (later renamed Tasmania) prior to the adoption of the current Tasmanian Flag in 1875. The earliest known reference to the Van Diemen's Land Ensign is from an 1850s flag chart by Captain John Nicholson, Harbour Master of Sydney. The flag is similar in design to the, which is believed to also be the historical origin of the Murray River Flag.

See also
 List of Australian flags
 Union Flag

References

Flags of Australia
Unofficial flags
History of Tasmania